Ludwig Gräf (25 August 1908 – 18 September 1978) was a German sports shooter who competed for Saar in two events at the 1952 Summer Olympics.

See also
 Saar at the 1952 Summer Olympics

References

External links
 

1908 births
1978 deaths
German male sport shooters
Olympic shooters of Saar
Shooters at the 1952 Summer Olympics
People from Homburg, Saarland
Sportspeople from Saarland
20th-century German people